RGRE Grafton Ltd v Bewley's Cafe Grafton Street Ltd and Bewley’s Ltd is an Irish legal case in the High Court between building owners RGRE Grafton Ltd and tenants Bewley's Cafe Grafton Street Ltd and Bewley's Ltd. The case related to non-payment of rent during the COVID-19 pandemic. RGRE sought a declaration that the stained-glass windows, designed by Harry Clarke) at Bewley's Oriental Café on Grafton Street in Dublin form part of the building and therefore belong to the landlord, as opposed to decorative panels that belong to the tenants.

In October 2022 it was announced that the judgment from Mr Justice Denis McDonald would be delayed until at least 8 December.

References

Republic of Ireland case law
Property case law